Canisius College is a private Catholic secondary school for boys, located in Menteng, Central Jakarta, Java, Indonesia. The school was founded by the Indonesian Province of the Society of Jesus in 1927.

Motto 

Administration structure 
The school is led by a Rector, who oversees the Senior and Junior High School Directors (Principals). Each principal has three vice principals, one each for Curricular Affairs, General Affairs, and Student Affairs, the last one more commonly known as the Prefect inside the school. The Rector, Principals, and Prefects traditionally are ordained Jesuit priests.

History

1927–1931 
Canisius' history began on 26 October 1926, with the arrival of Dr. J. Kurris, its first director. On 1 June 1927, the first class of AMS (Algemene Middelbare School) was started in a plot of land at Mentengweg. The plot of land included a 19th-century Indies Empire house where the school initially operated. The construction continued, and a new plot of land was bought. The land was intended to be used as the construction site of a new house. The construction was finished on 1 July 1929. On 26 October 1931, Canisius College achieved official status with the appointment of Fr. A. van Hoof, SJ, as its first rector.

1931–1942

1942–1946 
During World War II, all activities were suspended and the college was used as a public high school. In reality, there wasn't any activity in the school, due to the situation of Jakarta.

After Japan surrendered to the Allies and the Dutch forces returning to Indonesia as the NICA, Canisius was reopened on 1 January 1946. Even though the school was given the freedom to continue its activity by the NICA, the school showed resistance to NICA and supporting the Indonesian Government. The flagpole on Canisius flew the Indonesian flag. This caused the school to be partly occupied by paratroopers. When the paratroopers were replaced by the Gurkha Army, Canisius was able to re-obtain all of its territory, and re-obtained the whole building one year later.

1946–1949 
After the reopening of Canisius, a new rector was appointed : Fr. Lodewijk Ingenhousz. Ingenhousz proposed a national focused curriculum and proposed that the Indonesian language should be used as the main language in the school. This proposal met a resistance, due to the fact of the lack of schoolbooks in Indonesian language.

1952–1967 
In 1952, Canisius opened junior and senior high divisions. For 15 years (1952–1967), 90%-100% of students passed the national final examination. In 1967, the curriculum was changed and divided into three areas of study: culture-literature, social economics, and science. In 1974, the college implemented a point credit system.

Education 

As a private school, Canisius follows the Indonesia curriculum KTSP (Kurikulum Tingkat Satuan Pendidikan). In the high school, students are divided into two programs: Natural Science stream and Social Science stream. The Natural Science stream has five classes, while the Social Science stream has two classes, or seven classes in each of the three years.

Events held by the high school representative and Student Union include the Canisius College Education Fair, the Canisius College Cup, CASANOVA (Canisius Science, Art, and Language on Festival), and the Canisius Art Blast. Each year, Canisius Senior High sends its representatives to the International Science Olympiad. Canisius also holds character building programs, with events such as Jamborees, Live Ins, and Retreats.

Notable alumni 

Muhammad Chatib Basri, former Minister of Finance
Fauzi Bowo, Governor of Jakarta (2007–2012), Deputy governor of Jakarta (2002–2007)
Arief Budiman, sociologist
Soe Hok Gie, activist and politic analyst
Ginandjar Kartasasmita, former Minister of Finance
Ananda Sukarlan, first Indonesian pianist carried in International Who's Who in Music
Sehat Sutardja, co-founder of Marvell Technology Group, one of the richest men in the United States in 2007 by Forbes
Akbar Tandjung, former speaker of the House of Representatives
Jusuf Wanandi
Sofjan Wanandi, businessman, chief of Gemala Group
Rachmat Witoelar, former Minister of Ecology and Environment Welfare

Gallery

See also 

 Catholic Church in Indonesia
 Education in Indonesia
 Kolese Gonzaga
 Kolese Loyola
 List of Jesuit schools
 List of schools in Indonesia

References 

Educational institutions established in 1927
Jesuit secondary schools in Indonesia
Boys' schools in Indonesia
Schools in Jakarta
1927 establishments in the Dutch East Indies